William Martin (born February 16, 1957 in Bethesda, Maryland) is an American botanist and microbiologist, currently Head of the Institut für Molekulare Evolution, Heinrich Heine Universität, Düsseldorf.

Born in Bethesda, Maryland, Martin was educated at Richland College, Dallas, Texas, and Texas A&M University. After working as a carpenter in Dallas, Martin moved to Hannover, Germany, and obtained his university Diploma from Technische Universität Hannover in 1985. Martin's PhD is from Max-Planck-Institut für Züchtungsforschung, Cologne, where he did postdoctoral research, followed by further postdoctoral work at Institut für Genetik, Technische Universität Braunschweig, where he obtained his Habilitation in 1992. In 1999, Martin became full (C4) professor at Universität Düsseldorf.

Martin is a distinguished and sometimes controversial contributor to the field of molecular evolution and the origin of life. He is known particularly for his work on the evolution of the Calvin cycle and plastids including chloroplasts, and, more generally, for contributions to understanding the origin and evolution of eukaryotic cells. Martin is co-author, with Miklos Mueller of Rockefeller University, of the 1998 paper The Hydrogen hypothesis for the first eukaryote. A wealth of subsequent research papers include contributions, independently and with Michael J. Russell of the NASA Jet Propulsion Laboratory, to understanding the geochemical origins of cells and their biochemical pathways. Martin's work is well cited (nearly 30,000 times) and he has an h-index of 95.

Awards 
 1990: Heinz Maier-Leibnitz-Preis of the Deutsche Forschungsgemeinschaft
 1997: Technology Transfer Prize, Industrie und Handelskammer Braunschweig
 1998: Miescher-Ishida Prize of the International Society of Endocytobiology
2017: Spiridion Brusina Medal of the Croatian Society of Natural Sciences.
 2018: Preis der Klüh Stiftung

Honours 
 2000-2007 Foreign Associate, CIAR Programme in Evolutionary Biology 
 2001- Faculty 1000 Member for Plant Genomes and Evolution 
 2006- Elected Fellow, American Academy for Microbiology 
 2006-2009 Julius von Haast Fellow of the New Zealand Ministry for Research, Science and Technology
 2008    Elected Member of the Nordrhein-Westfälische Akademie der Wissenschaften

Selected publications 
 
 
 
 
 
 Madeline C. Weiss, Filipa L. Sousa, Natalia Mrnjavac, Sinje Neukirchen, Mayo Roettger, Shijulal Nelson-Sathi & William F. Martin: The physiology and habitat of the last universal common ancestor, Nature Microbiology (2016)

References

External links

 Molecular Evolution

Evolutionary biologists
Protistologists
Texas A&M University alumni
Technical University of Braunschweig alumni
University of Hanover alumni
People from Bethesda, Maryland
1957 births
Living people
21st-century American biologists
Richland College alumni